This is a list of all the electoral divisions in the non-metropolitan county of West Sussex.

These are new electoral divisions as recommended by the Boundary Committee for England following a review, carried out at the request of West Sussex County Council. The new divisions  of 71 single-member wards replaced the 70 seats that were contested across 62 divisions in 2005. The recommendations were accepted by the Electoral Commission in February 2009, who implemented the legal order authorising the change on 6 March 2009, allowing the new divisions to be used for the first time in the 4 June 2009 local elections .

Electoral divisions
Angmering & Findon
Arundel & Wick
Bersted
Bewbush & Ifield West
Billingshurst
Bognor Regis East
Bognor Regis West & Aldwick
Bourne
Bramber Castle
Broadfield
Broadwater
Burgess Hill East
Burgess Hill Town
Chichester East
Chichester North
Chichester South
Chichester West
Cissbury
Cuckfield & Lucastes
Durrington & Salvington
East Grinstead Meridian
East Grinstead South & Ashurst Wood
East Preston & Ferring
Felpham
Fernhurst
Fontwell
Goring
Gossops Green & Ifield East
Hassocks & Victoria
Haywards Heath East
Haywards Heath Town
Henfield
Holbrook
Horsham Hurst
Horsham Riverside
Horsham Tanbridge & Broadbridge Heath
Hurstpierpoint & Bolney
Imberdown
Kingston Buci
Lancing
Langley Green & West Green
Lindfield & High Weald
Littlehampton East
Littlehampton Town
Maidenbower
Middleton
Midhurst
Northbrook
Northgate & Three Bridges
Nyetimber
Petworth
Pound Hill & Worth
Pulborough
Roffey
Rustington
Saltings
Selsey
Shoreham
Sompting & North Lancing
Southgate & Crawley Central
Southwater & Nuthurst
Southwick
Storrington
Tarring
Tilgate & Furnace Green
Warnham & Rusper
Witterings, The
Worth Forest
Worthing East
Worthing Pier
Worthing West

References